Boks may refer to:

People
Evert Jan Boks (1838–1914), Dutch painter
Joost Boks (1942–2020), Dutch field hockey player
Theodoor Jacobus Boks (1893–1961?), Dutch mathematician

Sports
The South Africa national rugby union team, commonly known as the Springboks or Boks
Danish Open (tennis), also known as e-Boks Open

See also
Bok (disambiguation)